Yesterday's Dreams is a British romantic drama television series produced by Central Television for ITV. The series was written by Peter Gibbs and starred Paul Freeman and Judy Loe. Freeman and Loe play divorced couple Martin and Diane Daniels who rekindle their relationship after Diane begins a temping job at Martin's firm. Much of the series filmed in Tideswell, Derbyshire.

Synopsis

Seven years on from their divorce, Diane and Martin Daniels are living separate lives. Although Martin is at the peak of his career in the aerospace industry, he is coming under increasing pressure at work. Diane and her two teenage children live with her new partner Don, whose garage business is now in the doldrums. When financial problems force Diane to find work, the first company her secretarial agency places her with is Martin's. Inevitably, the two meet. Memories are shared, and old passions are rekindled, leading to painful decisions for everyone involved.

Cast and characters
Paul Freeman as Martin Daniels
Judy Loe as Diane Daniels
Trevor Byfield as Don Ackford
Patrick Troughton as Jack Daniels
Damien Lyne as Matthew Daniels
Frances Atkinson as Kate Daniels
Ed Devereaux as Gil
Kate McKenzie as Lynsey
Hugh Fraser as Dearman
Valerie Holliman as Sylvie
Margaret Devlin as Olive
Thelma Whiteley as Madge

DVD releases
Network released the series on DVD in Region 2.

External links

1987 British television series debuts
1987 British television series endings
1980s British drama television series
1980s British television miniseries
ITV television dramas
Television series by ITV Studios
English-language television shows
Television shows produced by Central Independent Television
Television shows set in Derbyshire